Based in Kenosha, Wisconsin, the Kenosha Comets were a women's professional baseball team that played from  through  in the All-American Girls Professional Baseball League. The team played their home games at Kenosha's Lake Front Stadium, but later moved to Simmons Field.

History
The Kenosha Comets were one of the first four teams in the AAGPBL.  Unofficially nicknamed the "Shamrocks" by out of town newspapers owing to their green uniforms, a contest to name the team was won by Mrs. Hazel Templeton who chose The Comets which the team officially adopted on June 4.   In 1943, the Comets posted the third-best record of the league at 56–52, but had won the second-half title (33–21) and earned a ticket to the playoffs; they were swept in three games by the Racine Belles.

Kenosha again placed third in 1944 (62–54) and made the playoffs, thanks to a first-half title (36–23). The Comets took a 3–2 lead over the Milwaukee Chicks in the best-of-seven series, but lost the decisive Game 7. Kenosha faded after that, placing last in 1945 (41–69), seventh of eight teams in 1946 (42–70), and last in 1947 (43–69).

The Comets rebounded in 1948, placing fifth (61–64) in the five–team Western Division and advancing to the playoffs, but were defeated by Racine in the first round, three games to zero. In 1949, Kenosha finished fourth (58–55) in the eight–team league, and lost to the Muskegon Lassies in two games during the first round of post–season action.

Their most productive season came in 1950, when they finished second with a 64–46 record, three games behind Racine, only to lose for the fifth straight appearance in the first round, this time to the Rockford Peaches in four games.

In 1951, Kenosha placed sixth (36–71) in the eight-team league, out of contention. The team folded at the end of the season.

In its nine years of history, the Kenosha Comets had in their rosters notable players as pitcher Helen Nicol and slugger Audrey Wagner, as well as Lois Florreich, Katie Horstman, Elizabeth Mahon, Dorothy Schroeder, and Fern Shollenberger.

All-time roster
Bold denotes members of the inaugural roster

Velma Abbott
Janet Anderson
Joyce Barnes
Catherine Bennett
Muriel Bevis
Ethel Boyce
Delores Brumfield
Jean Buckley
Mary Butcher
Helen Callaghan
Mary Carey
Isora Castillo
Jean Cione
Lucille Colacito
Clara Cook
Mildred Deegan
Mona Denton
Geraldine Edwards
Elizabeth Fabac
Helen Filarski
Lois Florreich
Rose Folder
Hermina Franks
Barbara Galdonik
Gertrude Ganote
Rose Mary Glaser
Bethany Goldsmith
Julie Gutz
Johanna Hageman
Martha Haines
Marjorie Hanna
Ann Harnett
Elise Harney
Martha Hayslip
Kay Heim
Lillian Hickey
Irene Hickson
Alice Hohlmayer
Beverly Holden
Joan Holderness
Mabel Holle
Katie Horstman
Dorothy Hunter
Shirley Jameson
Joan Jaykoski
Christine Jewitt
Marilyn Jones
Josephine Kabick
Marie Kazmierczak
Nancy King
Theresa Kobuszewski
Phyllis Koehn
Irene Kotowicz
Jean Ladd
Josephine Lenard
Mary Louise Lester
Barbara Liebrich
Claire Lobrovich
Jean Lovell
Ethel McCreary
Elizabeth Mahon
Jean Marlowe
Jacqueline Mattson
Anna Meyer
Darlene Mickelsen
Pauline Miller
Dorothy Naum
Merna Nearing
Helen Nicol
Helen Nordquist
Lex McCutchan
Patricia O'Connor
Anna Mae O'Dowd
Janice O'Hara
Barbara Parks
Ernestine Petras
Marjorie Pieper
Pauline Pirok
Mary Pratt
Magdalen Redman
Mary Rini
Martha Rommelaere
Barbara Rotvig
Blanche Schachter
Dorothy Schroeder
Dorothy Shinen
Kay Shinen
Fern Shollenberger
Helen Smith
Jean Smith
Ruby Stephens
Jeanette Stocker
Eunice Taylor
Yolande Teillet
Erla Thomas
Gloria Tipton
Marge Villa
Audrey Wagner
Evelyn Wawryshyn
Helen Westerman
Marian WohlwenderMary Wood
Trois Wood
Lois Youngen

Managers

References

Sources
All-American Girls Professional Baseball League history
All-American Girls Professional Baseball League official website – Kenosha Comets seasons
All-American Girls Professional Baseball League official website – Manager/Player profile search resultsAll-American Girls Professional Baseball League Record Book – W. C. Madden. Publisher: McFarland & Company, 2000. Format: Hardcover, 294pp. Language: English. The Women of the All-American Girls Professional Baseball League: A Biographical Dictionary''' – W. C. Madden. Publisher:  McFarland & Company, 2005. Format: Softcover, 295 pp. Language: English. 

All-American Girls Professional Baseball League teams
1943 establishments in Wisconsin
1951 disestablishments in Wisconsin
Baseball teams established in 1943
Baseball teams disestablished in 1951
Sports in Kenosha, Wisconsin
Defunct baseball teams in Wisconsin
Women's sports in Wisconsin